RTV BosTel or BosTel is a Bosnian language broadcaster in North America serving the Bosnian diaspora.

RTV BosTel's program started airing in September 2001 with a 2 hour program in the Chicago radio market, but has since then expanded into a 24-hour satellite television network throughout North America. RTV BosTel currently airs its channel on EURO World Network's Satellite platform on Galaxy-19 and also available on the NexTV America IPTV platform.

BosTel's viewers are able to get informed about the most recent news and important events that have happened in Bosnia and Herzegovina, along with North American Bosnian communities.

BosTel's mission is to connect the displaced Bosnians with their nation, their main focus is helping the community as much as possible.

External links 
RTV Bostel Homepage 

Television channels and stations established in 2001
Bosnian-American culture in Illinois
Bosnian language